This is a list of notable Jewish American entertainers. For other Jewish Americans, see Lists of Jewish Americans.

Actors (film and TV) & artists
organized by birth decade

2000s
Odessa Adlon (born 2000), actress
Asher Angel (born 2002), actor and singer
Julia Lester (born 2000), actress (High School Musical: The Musical: The Series)
David Mazouz (born 2001), actor
Joshua Rush (born 2001), actor (Andi Mack)
Noah Schnapp (born 2004), actor (Stranger Things)
Aidan Gallagher (born 2003), actor (The Umbrella Academy)
Bhad Bhabie (born 2003), singer (Italian from her mother side and Jewish from her father side)

1990s
Daniel Benzali (born 1946), actor, singer
Mac Miller (1992–2018), American rapper, singer-songwriter, and record producer
Madison Beer (born 1999), singer
Doja Cat (1995), American rapper, singer-songwriter
Sofia Black-D'Elia (born 1991), actress
Ben Levi Ross (born 1998), actor
Jonah Bobo (born 1997), film actor (Around the Bend, Zathura)
Ben Platt (born 1993), Broadway star, actor, singer and songwriter (Dear Evan Hansen, The Politician)
Dawn M. Bennett (born 1992), Filipino-American voice actress
Cameron Boyce (1999–2019), actor (Jessie)
Max Burkholder (born 1997), actor
Timothée Chalamet (born 1995), actor 
Emory Cohen (born 1990), actor
Flora Cross (born 1993), film actress (Bee Season)
Spencer Daniels (born 1992), actor 
Zoey Deutch (born 1994), actress
Ansel Elgort (born 1994), actor (Jewish father)
Beanie Feldstein (born 1993), actress (Lady Bird, Booksmart)
Julia Garner (born 1994), actress
Zachary Gordon (born 1998), film actor (Diary of a Wimpy Kid)
Alexander Gould (born 1994), film/TV actor (Finding Nemo)
Teo Halm (born 1999), actor
Carter Jenkins (born 1991), film/TV actor 
Hunter King (born 1993), actress, (The Young and the Restless)
Kira Kosarin (born 1997), actress (The Thundermans)
Lauv (born 1994), singer-songwriter, record producer
Logan Lerman (born 1992), film/TV actor (Percy Jackson & the Olympians: The Lightning Thief)
Jonathan Lipnicki (born 1990), film actor (Jerry Maguire, Like Mike)
James Maslow (born 1990), actor/singer
Blake Michael (born 1996), actor
Ezra Miller (born 1992), film actor
Ian Nelson (born 1995), actor
Nicola Peltz (born 1994), actress
Ryan Potter (born 1995), actor
Charlie Puth (born 1991), singer-songwriter
Nathalia Ramos (born 1992), Spanish-born American actress (Bratz: The Movie)
Sarah Ramos (born 1991), TV actress (American Dreams)
Ben Rosenfield (born c. 1992/93), actor
Odeya Rush (born 1997), Israeli-born American
Daryl Sabara (born 1992), actor (Spy Kids, Keeping Up with the Steins, Halloween)
Halston Sage (born 1993), actress
Larry Saperstein (born 1998), actor (High School Musical: The Musical: The Series)
Eden Sher (born 1991), actress, The Middle TV series
Troye Sivan (born 1995), singer, actor
Adiel Stein (born 1991), film actor (Stolen Summer)
Hailee Steinfeld (born 1996), actor (True Grit, Ender's Game, Pitch Perfect 2); singer of "Love Myself" (Jewish father)
Zoe Weizenbaum (born 1991), film actress (Memoirs of a Geisha)
Nat Wolff (born 1994), actor/musician (Jewish father)

1980s
Dianna Agron (born 1986), actress and singer
Jonathan Ahdout (born 1989), actor (House of Sand and Fog, 24)
Jack Antonoff (born 1984), Singer/songwriter/record producer (Member of the bands FUN, Bleachers & Steel Train)
Skylar Astin (born Skylar Astin Lipstein; 1987), actor and singer
Justin Baldoni (born 1984), actor (Everwood)
David "Lil Dicky" Andrew Burd (born 1988), rapper and comedian
Rachel Bloom (born 1987), actress, singer and comedy writer (Crazy Ex-Girlfriend)
Alison Brie (born 1982), actress (Community, The LEGO Movie and GLOW)
Amanda Bynes (born 1986), film actress and former show host on Nickelodeon (She's the Man)
Lizzy Caplan (born 1982), film/TV actress (Mean Girls, Cloverfield)
Greg Cipes (born 1980), actor, entertainer, singer-songwriter, and professional surfer 
Chanel West Coast (born 1988), TV personality, rapper, singer
Lauren Cohan (born 1982), film/television actress (Supernatural)
Matt Cohen (born 1982), film/TV actor

Alexa Davalos (born 1982), actress
John Francis Daley (born 1985), actor/director (Freaks and Geeks)
Kat Dennings (born 1986), film/TV actress
Daveed Diggs (born 1982), actor, rapper
Drake (musician) (born 1986), rapper/musician
Lena Dunham (born 1986), actress/writer/director (Girls)
Zac Efron (born 1987), film/TV actor (Efron's paternal grandfather was Jewish, and Efron has referred to himself as Jewish)
Alden Ehrenreich (born 1989), actor
Jesse Eisenberg (born 1983), film actor (The Squid and the Whale)
Ben Foster (born 1980), actor
Jon Foster (born 1984), film/TV actor (Stay Alive)
Shayna Fox (born 1984), voice actress
Dave Franco (born 1985), actor
Seth Gabel (born 1981), American actor
Andrew Garfield (born 1983), British and American actor
Rafi Gavron (born 1989), British and American actor
Gideon Glick (born 1988), actor
Joseph Gordon-Levitt (born 1981), film/TV actor
Max Greenfield (born 1980), film/TV actor
Jake Gyllenhaal (born 1980), film actor (Brokeback Mountain)
Armie Hammer (born 1986), actor (has identified himself as "half Jewish")
Erin Heatherton (born 1989), model and actress
Simon Helberg (born 1980), TV actor and comedian (The Big Bang Theory)
Jonah Hill (born 1983), film actor
Scarlett Johansson (born 1984), film actress (Jewish mother)
Ariana Jollee (born 1982), pornographic actress and pornographic film director
Jeremy Jordan (born 1984), stage/musical film/television actor (Jewish mother)
Avriel Kaplan (born 1989), musician/songwriter (vocal bassist of a cappella group Pentatonix, founder of musical group Avriel & the Sequoias)
Jonathan Keltz (born 1988), Canadian and American actor
Ethan Klein (born 1985), internet personality
Zoe Kravitz (born 1988), actress, model and singer
Mila Kunis (born 1983), TV actress (That '70s Show, Family Guy)
Adam Lamberg (born 1984), actor (Lizzie McGuire)
Adam Lambert (born 1982), singer and runner-up on American Idol
Shia LaBeouf (born 1986), TV/film actor (Even Stevens, Holes, Disturbia, Transformers)
Samm Levine (born 1982), film/TV actor
Margarita Levieva (born 1980), actress and professional gymnast
Alex D. Linz (born 1989), actor (Home Alone 3, Max Keeble's Big Move)
Lauren London (born 1984), actress (ATL)
Jessica Manley (born 1985), actress (Anne Frank: The Whole Story)
Eli Marienthal (born 1986), film actor (Confessions of a Teenage Drama Queen)
Scott Mechlowicz (born 1981), film actor (EuroTrip, Mean Creek)
Sara Paxton (born 1988), actress (Darcy's Wild Life, Aquamarine)
Josh Peck (born 1986), actor (Drake & Josh)
Ashley Peldon (born 1984), film/TV actress
Courtney Peldon (born 1981), film/TV actress
Alisan Porter (born 1981), film and stage actress and singer
Natalie Portman (born 1981), Israeli-born film actor (V for Vendetta)
Laura Prepon (born 1980), film/TV actress (That '70s Show)
Nikki Reed (born 1988), film actress/screenwriter (Thirteen)
Emmy Rossum (born 1986), actress, singer-songwriter
Daniela Ruah (born 1983), Portuguese-American actress
Ben Schwartz (born 1981), actor, writer, comedian 
Jason Schwartzman (born 1980), actor and member of the band Phantom Planet
Jason Segel (born 1980), film/TV actor
Jamie-Lynn Sigler (born 1981), film/TV actress and singer (The Sopranos)
Jenny Slate (born 1982), actress/comedian
Jussie Smollett (born 1982), actor (Empire)
Jurnee Smollett-Bell (born 1986), actress (True Blood)
Marla Sokoloff (born 1980), film/TV actress (Big Day)
Shoshannah Stern (born 1980), TV actress
Lauren Storm (born 1987), TV actress (Flight 29 Down)
Khleo Thomas (born 1989), film actor (Holes)
Ashley Tisdale (born 1985), actress and singer (High School Musical)
Michelle Trachtenberg (born 1985), film/TV actress
Joseph Trohman (born 1984), musician (Fall Out Boy)
Raviv (Ricky) Ullman (born 1986), Israeli-born actor, teen idol (Phil of the Future)
Anneliese van der Pol (born 1984), Dutch/American actress (That's So Raven)
Mara Wilson (born 1987), film actress (Matilda)
James Wolk (born 1985), actor
Evan Rachel Wood (born 1987), film actress (Thirteen, The Upside of Anger)
Anton Yelchin (1989–2016), Russian-born film/TV actor
Joey Zimmerman (born 1986), film/TV actor (Halloweentown)

1970s
Dave Annable (born 1979), actor
Shiri Appleby (born 1978), Israeli/American film/TV actress (Roswell)
David Arquette (born 1971), film actor
Eric Balfour (born 1977), actor
Elizabeth Banks (born 1974), film actress (Invincible)
Justin Bartha (born 1978), film actor (National Treasure, The Hangover)
Amber Benson (born 1977), actress (Buffy the Vampire Slayer)
Elizabeth Berkley (born 1972), TV, film, and stage actress
Jon Bernthal (born 1976), actor
Mayim Bialik (born 1975), actress (Blossom)
Michael Ian Black (born Michael Ian Schwartz, 1971), actor, comedian and comedy writer
Selma Blair (born Selma Bleitner, 1972), film actress, raised w/ Jewish day school (Cruel Intentions)
Alex Borstein (born 1971), actress, writer, and comedian
Caprice Bourret (born 1971), fashion model and actress, often known by her first name
Zach Braff (born 1975), film/TV actor, director, screenwriter, and producer (Scrubs, Garden State)
Tamara Braun (born 1971), soap opera actress
Adam Brody (born 1979), actor (The O.C.)
Adrien Brody (born 1973), film actor (The Pianist)
Sarah Brown (born 1975), actress
Brooke Burke (born 1971), TV personality and model
Scott Caan (born 1976), film actor, son of James Caan
Josh Charles (born 1971), stage, film, and TV actor
Emmanuelle Chriqui (born 1977), film/TV actress
Jennifer Connelly (born 1970), film and TV actress (Requiem for a Dream)
Eric Dane (born 1972), actor
Erin Daniels (born Erin Cohen, 1973), actress
Brad Delson (born 1977), guitarist for the band Linkin Park
Dustin Diamond (1977–2021), actor (Saved by the Bell)
Oded Fehr (born 1970), Israeli/American actor (The Mummy)
Corey Feldman (born 1971), film actor, 1980s teen idol
James Franco (born 1978), film actor (James Dean, Spider-Man)
Soleil Moon Frye (born 1976), actress and director (Punky Brewster)
Sarah Michelle Gellar (born 1977), actress, writer, director, filmmaker, comedian, singer (Buffy the Vampire Slayer)
Goapele (born 1977), singer-songwriter
Elon Gold (born 1970), comedian, TV actor, writer, and producer
Ginnifer Goodwin (born 1978), film/TV actress (Big Love)
Seth Green (born 1974), actor, writer, and TV producer
Bryan Greenberg (born 1978), film/TV actor (Prime)
Maggie Gyllenhaal (born 1977), Golden Globe-nominated actress
Corey Haim (1971–2010), Canadian-born film actor
Chelsea Handler (born 1975), actress/comedian
Alyson Hannigan (born 1974), actress (Buffy the Vampire Slayer, Date Movie)
Danielle Harris (born 1977), actress
Samantha Harris (born Samantha Harris Shapiro, 1973), actress and TV presenter
Cole Hauser (born 1975), film actor
Jason Hervey (born 1972), actor (The Wonder Years)
Kate Hudson (born 1979), film actress (Almost Famous, How to Lose a Guy in 10 Days)
Oliver Hudson (born 1976), film/TV actor
Rashida Jones (born 1976), actress, writer, model, and musician (The Office)
Chris Kattan (born 1970), comedian (Saturday Night Live)
Joel Kinnaman (born 1979), Swedish and American actor (Jewish mother)
Nick Kroll (born 1978), Comedian/Actor
Alla Korot (born 1970), Ukrainian-born actress
Lisa Kushell (born 1971), comedic actress (MADtv, co-host of Dinner and a Movie)
David Krumholtz (born 1978), actor (NUMB3RS)
Adam Levine (born 1979), musician (Maroon 5)
Jenny Lewis (born 1976), musician and former child actress
Michael Lucas (born 1972), Russian-born porn star
Jamie Luner (born 1971), actress (Melrose Place)
Natasha Lyonne (born Natasha Braunstein, 1979), film/TV actress (American Pie)
Gabriel Macht (born 1972), film actor
Matisyahu (born Matthew Paul Miller, 1979), singer and rapper
Idina Menzel (born 1971), actress, singer and songwriter
Marisol Nichols (born 1973), actress (Jewish biological father)
Gwyneth Paltrow (born 1972), actress and singer
Adam Pascal (born 1970), actor (Rent)
Amanda Peet (born 1972), film actress
Joaquin Phoenix (born Joaquin Bottom, 1974), film actor (Walk the Line)
Rain Phoenix (born Rain Bottom, 1973), actress/musician
River Phoenix (born River Bottom, 1970–1993), film actor
Summer Phoenix (born 1978), actress and model
Pink (born Alecia Moore, 1979), singer and actress
Dave Portnoy (born 1977), founder of (Barstool Sports)
Josh Radnor (born 1976), actor (How I Met Your Mother)
Leah Remini (born 1970), actress (The King of Queens)
Simon Rex (born 1974), actor and model
Michael Rosenbaum (born 1972), film/TV actor (Smallvile)
Tracee Ellis Ross (born Tracee Joy Silberstein, 1972), actress, daughter of singer Diana Ross
Eli Roth (born 1972), film actor, director, producer and writer
Maya Rudolph (born 1972), actress/comedian (Saturday Night Live)
Winona Ryder (born Winona Horowitz, 1971), film actress
Antonio Sabato Jr. (born 1972), actor and model
Sarah Saltzberg (born 1976), Broadway theater actress
Andy Samberg (born	David Andrew Samberg, 1978), comedian; part of group The Lonely Island; Saturday Night Live
Fred Savage (born 1976), actor and TV director (Wonder Years)
Miriam Shor (born 1971), film/TV actress (Big Day)
Sarah Silverman (born 1970), stand-up comedian, actress, and writer
David Moscow (born 1974), actor (Jewish from his father side)
Alicia Silverstone (born 1976), actress and former fashion model (Clueless, Batman and Robin)
Ione Skye (born Ione Skye Leitch, 1971), English-born actress
Lindsay Sloane (born Lindsay Sloane Leikin, 1977), actress
Bahar Soomekh (born 1975), Iranian-born actress (Crash)
Tori Spelling (born 1973), actress (Beverly Hills 90210)
Jordana Spiro (born 1977), TV actress (My Boys)
Corey Stoll (born 1976), actor
Matt Stone (born 1971), animator, film director, screenwriter, actor, voice actor, and co-creator of South Park
Danny Strong (born 1974), film/TV actor
Jonathan Togo (born 1977), actor (CSI: Miami, Mystic River)
Mageina Tovah (born Mageina Tovah Begtrup, 1979), actress
Kevin Weisman (born 1970), film/TV actor
Jennifer Westfeldt (born 1971), actress and writer (Kissing Jessica Stein)
Marissa Jaret Winokur (born 1973), film, TV, and stage actress (Hairspray stage version)
Noah Wyle (born 1971), film/TV actor
Nikki Ziering (born Natalie Schiele, 1971), model and actress
Jason Zimbler (born 1977), actor (Clarissa Explains It All)
Ethan Zohn (born 1973), Survivor: Africa winner and actor
Arianne Zuker (born Arianne Zuckerman, 1974), soap opera actress

1960s
Tony Goldwyn (born 1960), actor (paternal grandfather was Jewish)
Paula Abdul (born 1962), singer-songwriter, record producer, actress, dancer, and choreographer
Lenny Kravitz (born 1964), singer-songwriter
Steven Adler (born 1965), musician, songwriter, drummer (Guns N' Roses)
Patricia Arquette (born 1968), Golden Globe-nominated actress
Hank Azaria (born 1964), film/TV actor, director, comedian, and voice artist
David Alan Basche (born 1968), actor
Randall Batinkoff (born 1968), film/TV actor (For Keeps?)
Mary Kay Bergman (1961–1999), voice actress (South Park)
Troy Beyer (born 1964), film director, screenwriter, and actress
Craig Bierko (born 1964), film/TV actor (Cinderella Man)
Jack Black (born 1969), film actor and musician
Lisa Bonet (born 1967), film/TV actress (The Cosby Show)
Matthew Broderick (born 1962), film and stage actor (Ferris Bueller's Day Off, The Producers)
Gabrielle Carteris (born 1961), actress (Beverly Hills 90210)
Max Casella (born 1967), actor (Doogie Howser)
Scott Cohen (born 1964), film/TV actor
Mindy Cohn (born 1966), TV actress (The Facts of Life)
David Cross (born 1964), actor/comedian
Dean Devlin (born 1962), former actor, now producer and screenwriter
Don Diamont (born Donald Feinberg, 1961), soap opera actor (The Young and the Restless)
Robert Downey Jr. (born 1965), actor and musician (Iron Man)
David Duchovny (born 1960), film/TV actor (The X-Files)
Lisa Edelstein (born 1967), actress (House)
Jon Favreau (born 1966), actor/director
Dan Futterman (born 1967), actor and screenwriter
Jeff Garlin (born 1962), comic actor (Curb Your Enthusiasm)
Brad Garrett (born Bradley Harold Gerstenfeld, 1960), actor and comedian
Gina Gershon (born 1962), film actress
Jami Gertz (born 1965), film/TV actress
Melissa Gilbert (born 1964), former child actress, two terms as president of Screen Actors Guild
Judy Gold (born 1962), stand-up comedian and actress
Bill Goldberg (born 1966), former wrestler; wrestled for both World Championship Wrestling (WCW) and World Wrestling Entertainment (WWE), film/TV actor
Jennifer Grey (born 1960), actress and dancer (Dirty Dancing)
Arye Gross (born 1960), film/TV actor
Greg Grunberg (born 1966), film/TV actor (Heroes)
Annabelle Gurwitch (born 1961), comedic actress, hostess of TBS's Dinner and a Movie
Jessica Hecht (born 1965), film/stage actress
Monica Horan (born 1963), TV actress (Everybody Loves Raymond)
Helen Hunt (born 1963), actress
Sean Kanan (born Sean Perelman, 1966), soap opera actor (General Hospital)
Lesli Kay (born Lesli Pushkin, 1965), actress (As the World Turns); had first individual girl's bat mitzvah in West Virginia
Heather Paige Kent (born 1969), TV actress
Marc Kudisch (born 1966), stage actor
Lisa Kudrow (born 1963), actress (Friends)
Juliet Landau (born 1965), actress (Ed Wood), daughter of Martin Landau and Barbara Bain
John Lehr (born 1967), actor/comedian (10 Items or Less)
Jennifer Jason Leigh (born Jennifer Lee Morrow, 1962), Hollywood film actress (Fast Times at Ridgemont High)
Julia Louis-Dreyfus (born 1961), actress (Seinfeld)
Joshua Malina (born 1966), film and stage actor
Camryn Manheim (born 1961), actress (The Practice)
Cindy Margolis (born 1965), actress/model; in 2000 Guinness Book of World Records as the "most downloaded" person in 1999
Julianna Margulies (born 1966), film/TV actress (ER)
Marc Maron (born 1963), comedian, film/TV actor
Brett Marx (born 1964), actor (The Bad News Bears); great nephew of the Marx Brothers
Marlee Matlin (born 1965), actress (Children of a Lesser God)
Debra Messing (born 1968), actress (Will & Grace)
Dina Meyer (born 1968), film/TV actress (Saw films)
Ari Meyers (born 1969), actress (Kate & Allie)
Rob Morrow (born 1962), actor (Northern Exposure, Numb3rs)
Sarah Jessica Parker (born 1965), Golden Globe, Emmy-winning actress
Sean Penn (born 1960), film actor (Mystic River, Milk)
Jeremy Piven (born 1965), actor (Entourage)
Rain Pryor (born 1969), actress and comedian, daughter of Richard Pryor
Ted Raimi (born 1965), actor, brother of Spider-Man director Sam Raimi
Adam Rich (born 1968), child actor (Eight is Enough)
Paul Rudd (born 1969), actor and screenwriter
Adam Sandler (born 1966), actor, stand-up comedian, screenwriter, producer, and musician
Rob Schneider (born 1963), actor, comedian, and screenwriter
Bitty Schram (born 1968), Golden Globe-nominated actress
Liev Schreiber (born 1967), Tony Award-winning actor
Scott Schwartz (born 1968), child actor (A Christmas Story and The Toy)
David Schwimmer (born 1966), Emmy-nominated actor and director (Friends)
Sam Seder (born 1966), actor, comedian, writer, producer, director
Kyra Sedgwick (born 1965), Emmy-nominated actress
Ally Sheedy (born 1962), screen and stage actress ("Brat Pack" films The Breakfast Club and St. Elmo's Fire)
Jonathan Silverman (born 1966), film/TV actor
Helen Slater (born 1963), film actress and singer-songwriter (title role in Supergirl)
Rena Sofer (born 1968), actress
Jon Stewart (born Jonathan Stuart Leibowitz, 1962), stand-up comedian, actor, author; host, head writer, and producer of The Daily Show
Ben Stiller (born 1965), Emmy Award-winning comedian, actor, and film director
Lars Ulrich (born 1963), Danish-born Metallica drummer
Michael Vartan (born 1968), French-born film/TV actor (Monster-in-Law)
Steven Weber (born 1961), film/TV actor (Wings)
Scott Wolf (born 1968), actor (Party of Five)
Ian Ziering (born 1964), actor (Beverly Hills 90210)

1950s
Caroline Aaron (born 1957), actress and producer
Jason Alexander (born Jay Greenspan, 1959), actor, comedian, writer, director
Adam Arkin (born 1956), film, TV, and stage actor
Rosanna Arquette (born 1959), actress, film director, and film producer
Ellen Barkin (born 1954), actress
Roseanne Barr (born 1952), actress, comedian, writer and television producer
Robin Beck (born 1954), singer-songwriter, record producer
Robby Benson (born Robin David Segal, 1956), actor, former teen idol
Mike Binder (born 1958), screenwriter, film director, and actor
Kate Capshaw (born 1953), actress (Indiana Jones)
Jamie Lee Curtis (born 1958), Golden Globe-winning film actress, writer of books for children
Fran Drescher (born 1957), actor, producer, writer, comedian
Danny Elfman (born 1953), musician, composer
Wayne Federman (born 1959), comedian, actor, author (Maravich)
Tovah Feldshuh (born 1952), actress, singer, and playwright
Harvey Fierstein (born 1954), actor, author, and singer
Deb Filler (born 1954), actress, comic, singer and writer
Carrie Fisher (1956–2016), film actress, novelist (Star Wars)
Al Franken (born 1951), comedian, actor, author, radio host, and U.S. Senator
Jeff Goldblum (born 1952), film actor
Steve Guttenberg (born 1958), actor
Mary Hart (born 1950), actress and TV personality (Entertainment Tonight)
Amy Irving (born 1953), actress
David Lee Roth (born 1954), singer/musician
Paul Stanley (born 1952), guitarist for KISS
Toni Kalem (born 1956), film/TV actress, screenwriter, and director
Carol Kane (born 1952), actress
Julie Kavner (born 1950), film/TV actress (voice of Marge on The Simpsons)
Richard Kind (born 1956), actor
John Landis (born 1950), actor, director, writer, and producer
Carol Leifer (born 1956), comedian and actress
Joan Lunden (born Joan Blunden, 1950), broadcaster (Good Morning America)
Melanie Mayron (born 1952), actress and director (Thirtysomething)
Larry Miller (born 1953), stand-up comedian, actor
Don Most (born 1953), actor (Happy Days)
Judd Nelson (born 1959), actor and screenwriter (The Breakfast Club, Billionaire Boys Club)
Bebe Neuwirth (born 1958), theater, TV, and film actress
Laraine Newman (born 1952), comedian and actress
Ken Olin (born 1954), actor, director and producer
Mandy Patinkin (born 1952), actor of stage and screen, and singer/interpreter of Yiddish songs
Lorna Patterson (born 1956), film, stage and TV actress
Scott Patterson (born 1958), actor (Gilmore Girls)
David Paymer (born 1954), character actor
Ron Perlman (born 1950), film/TV actor (Hellboy)
Kevin Pollak (born 1957), actor, impressionist, and comedian
Paul Reiser (born 1957), actor, author, and stand-up comedian (Mad About You)
Paul Reubens (born Paul Rubenfeld, 1952), aka Peewee Herman
Alan Rosenberg (born 1950), actor, 24th president of the Screen Actors Guild
Katey Sagal (born 1954), actress, singer, and writer (Married... with Children)
Bob Saget (1956–2022), actor, stand-up comedian, and game show host
Richard Schiff (born 1955), actor (The West Wing)
Steven Seagal (born 1952), actor, screenwriter, producer, martial artist, and musician
Jerry Seinfeld (born 1954), comedian, actor, and writer
Jane Seymour (born Joyce Frankenberg, 1951), English-born film/TV actress
Wendie Jo Sperber (1958–2005), TV/movie actress
Howard Stern (born 1954), radio/TV personality, media mogul, humorist, actor, and author
Stephen Tobolowsky (born 1951), actor
Robert Trebor (born Robert Schenkman, 1953), actor (Hercules, Xena)
Debra Winger (born 1955), actress
Leslie Hoffman (born 1955), actress-stuntwoman
Mare Winningham (born 1959), film/TV actress

1940s
Bob Balaban (born 1945), actor and director
Richard Belzer (born 1944), stand-up comedian, writer, and actor
Lewis Black (born 1948), stand-up comedian and actor
Albert Brooks (born Albert Lawrence Einstein, 1947–), stand-up comedian, director, screenwriter, actor
James Caan (born 1940), film, stage, and TV actor (The Godfather)
Nell Carter (1948–2003), singer and film, stage, and TV actress
Peter Coyote (born Rachmil Pinchus Ben Mosha Cohon, 1941–), actor and author
Gene Simmons (born 1949), guitarist for KISS
Larry David (born 1947), Emmy-winning writer, director, comedian, actor, producer, co-creator of Seinfeld, and creator of Curb Your Enthusiasm
Richard Dreyfuss (born 1947), actor (The Goodbye Girl)
Bob Dylan (born Robert Allen Zimmerman, 1941), singer-songwriter, author, musician, and poet, also appeared in several films
Bob Einstein (1942–2019), writer and comedian known as Super Dave
Richard Elfman (born 1949), film director, writer, and actor
Donald Fagen (born 1948), musician, singer-songwriter, cultural critic, author, columnist, writer, and co-founder of the famous jazz-rock duo Steely Dan
Harrison Ford (born 1942), actor
Bonnie Franklin (1944–2013), actress
Art Garfunkel (born 1941), singer and songwriter
Paul Michael Glaser (born 1943), actor (Starsky & Hutch)
Scott Glenn (born 1941), actor
Christopher Guest (born 1948), comedian, screenwriter, composer, musician, film director, actor, and Spinal Tap member
Goldie Hawn (born 1945), film actress, director, and producer
Dan Hedaya (born 1940), character actor
Sandy Helberg (born 1949), actor
Barbara Hershey (born Barbara Lynn Herzstein, 1948), actress
Ricky Jay (born Richard Jay Potash, 1946–2018), professional sleight-of-hand artist, actor, and author
Billy Joel (born 1949), singer-songwriter, and musician
Madeline Kahn (1942–1999), actress of film, TV, and theater
Gabe Kaplan (born 1945), actor, comedian, and professional poker player
Andy Kaufman (1949–1984), comedian; devout Jewish parents
Judy Kaye (born 1948), singer and actress
Lainie Kazan (born Lanie Levine, 1940), actress and singer
Robert Klein (born 1942), stand-up comedian and occasional actor
Kevin Kline (born 1947), stage and film actor
Richard Kline (born 1944), actor and TV director
Sherry Lansing (born 1944), former CEO of Paramount Studios and actress
Michael Lembeck (born 1948), actor and director
Richard Lewis (born 1947), comedian and actor
Judith Light (born 1949), actress (Who's the Boss?)
Peggy Lipton (born 1947), TV actress and socialite (The Mod Squad)
Stephen Macht (born 1942), actor
Richard Masur (born 1948), actor
Bette Midler (born 1945), singer, actress, and comedian
Olivia Newton-John (1948–2022), singer, actor, author, environmental activist, cancer activist, four time Grammy winner. Mother Irene Born, Jewish. Maternal grandfather Max Born, Nobel Prize winning Physicist
David Proval (born 1942), actor (The Sopranos)
Gilda Radner (1946–1989), comedian and actress (Saturday Night Live)
Harold Ramis (1944–2014), director, actor, writer, and producer
Lou Reed (1942–2013), musician, singer-and songwriter
Rob Reiner (born 1947), actor, director, producer, writer
Peter Riegert (born 1947), film/TV actor
Jill St. John (born 1940), actress
Garry Shandling (1949–2016), comedian and actor
Wallace Shawn (born 1943), actor and writer
Harry Shearer (born 1943), actor, comedian, writer, and radio host
Paul Simon (born 1941), singer-songwriter
Brent Spiner (born 1949), actor (Star Trek: The Next Generation)
Sylvester Stallone (born 1946), film actor, director, producer, and screenwriter (Rocky), maternally Jewish
Barbra Streisand (born 1942), two-time Academy Award-winning singer and actress
Jeffrey Tambor (born 1944), film/TV actor (Hellboy, Arrested Development)
Jessica Walter (1941–2021), film/TV actress (Arrested Development)
Zoë Wanamaker (born 1949), American-born English actress
Lesley Ann Warren (born 1946), stage, film, and TV actress
Anson Williams (born Anson William Heimlick, 1949), actor (Happy Days)
Henry Winkler (born 1945), actor, director, producer, and author (Happy Days)

1930s
Woody Allen (born Allan Stewart Konigsberg, 1935), film director, writer, actor, and stand-up comedian
Alan Arkin (born 1934), film actor, director
Barbara Barrie (born 1931), actress and author of children's books
Richard Benjamin (born 1938), actor and film director
Dyan Cannon (born Samille Diane Friesen, 1937), film/TV actress, editor, producer, and director
Eddie Carmel (1936–1972), entertainer known as "The Jewish Giant"
Jerry Douglas (born Gerald Rubenstein, 1932–2021), TV actress (The Young and the Restless)
Elliott Gould (born Elliot Goldstein, 1938), film/TV actor
Andre Gregory (born 1934), actor-writer-director, known for My Dinner with Andre
Charles Grodin (1935–2021), actor and cable talk show host
Judd Hirsch (born 1935), actor (Taxi, NUMB3RS)
Dustin Hoffman (born 1937), two-time-Oscar-winning actor
Tony Jay (1933–2006), English/American actor
Harvey Keitel (born 1939), actor
Larry King (1933-2021), television host
Walter Koenig (born 1936), actor, writer, teacher, and director (appeared in original Star Trek)
Yaphet Kotto (1939–2021), African-American actor; son of Cameroonian Crown Prince (role in Alien)
Michael Landon (born Eugene Maurice Orowitz, 1936–1991), actor, producer, and director
Louise Lasser (born 1939), stage/film/TV actress (Mary Hartman, Mary Hartman)
Piper Laurie (born Rosetta Jacobs, 1932–), actress
Linda Lavin (born 1937), stage, film, and TV actress
Steve Lawrence (born Sidney Liebowitz, 1935–), singer and actor (The Carol Burnett Show)
Shari Lewis (born Sonia Phyllis Hurwitz, 1933–1998), ventriloquist, puppeteer, and children's TV show host
Hal Linden (born Harold Lipshitz, 1931), actor and TV director (Barney Miller)
Tina Louise (born 1934), model, singer, and film/TV actress
Jackie Mason (born Yacov Moshe Maza, 1928–2021), stand-up comedian/actor
Paul Mazursky (1930–2014), film director and actor
 Shelley Morrison (1936-2019) American actress to Jewish-Sephardic parents.
Barry Newman (born 1938), actor
Leonard Nimoy (1931–2015), film director, actor; played Spock on Star Trek
Suzanne Pleshette (1937–2008), actress (The Bob Newhart Show)
Ron Rifkin (born 1939), actor, director
Joan Rivers (born Joan Alexandra Molinsky Sanger Rosenberg, 1933–2014), comedian, actress, talk show host
George Segal (1934–2021), film and stage actor
Susan Strasberg (1938–1999), actress (In Praise of Older Women)
Dame Elizabeth Taylor (1932–2011), Oscar-winning English/American film actress and sex symbol
Gene Wilder (born Jerome Silberman, 1933–2016), actor and comedian

1920s
Marty Allen (1922–2018), stand-up comedian and actor
Ed Ames (born Edmund Dantes Urick, 1927), singer and actor
Beatrice Arthur (born Bernice Frankel, 1922–2009), actress
Ed Asner (1929–2021), actor
Lauren Bacall (born Betty Joan Perske, 1924–2014), film and stage actress
Julian Beck (1925–1985), actor, director, poet, and painter
Shelley Berman (1926–2017), comedian, writer, teacher, and actor
Herschel Bernardi (1923–1986), film, Broadway, and TV actor
Theodore Bikel (1924–2015), character actor, folk singer, and musician
Larry Blyden (1925–1975), actor
Tom Bosley (1927–2010), film/TV actor (Happy Days)
Mel Brooks (born Melvin Kaminsky, 1926), director, writer, actor, and stand-up comedian
Lenny Bruce (born Leonard Schneider, 1925–1966), stand-up comedian, writer, social critic, satirist
Susan Cabot (1927–1986), actress
Sid Caesar (1922–2014), comic actor and writer
Robert Clary (born Robert Max Widerman, 1926–2022), French-born actor, published author, and lecturer
Tony Curtis (born Bernard Schwartz, 1925–2010), film actor
Rodney Dangerfield (born Jacob Cohen, 1921–2004), comedian and actor
Sammy Davis Jr. (1925–1990) (converted to Judaism), entertainer, member of the "Rat Pack"
Peter Falk (1927–2011), actor
Fyvush Finkel (1922–2016), actor
Eddie Fisher (1928–2010), singer; father of Carrie Fisher
Lee Grant (born Lyova Haskell Rosenthal, 1927), theater, film, and TV actress, and film director
Buddy Hackett (born Leonard Hacker, 1924–2003), stand-up comedian, writer, actor, and producer
Monty Hall (born Monte Halperin, 1921–2017), Canadian-born actor, singer, and sportscaster (Let's Make a Deal)
Estelle Harris (born Estelle Nussbaum, 1928–2022), actress (Seinfeld)
Laurence Harvey (born Zvi Mosheh Skikne, 1928–1973), Lithuanian-born actor; British and American films
Steven Hill (born Solomon Krakovsky, 1922–2016), film/TV actor
Judy Holliday (born Judith Tuvim, 1921–1965), actress, singer
Werner Klemperer (1920–2000), comedic actor
Jack Klugman (1922–2012), actor
Harvey Korman (1927–2008), actor
Martin Landau (1928–2017), film/TV actor
Al Lewis (born Albert Meister, 1920–2006), actor (Grandpa Munster)
Jerry Lewis (born Joseph Levitch, 1926–2017), comedian, actor, and charity fund-raising telethons
Bill Macy (1922–2019), actor
Ross Martin (born Martin Rosenblatt, 1920–1981), Polish-born (Jewish family) film/TV actor (Wild Wild West)
Walter Matthau (1920–2000), actor
Anne Meara (1929–2015), comedian and actress, partner and wife of Jerry Stiller
Marilyn Monroe (1926–1962), actress, singer, and model, converted to Judaism.
Vic Morrow (1929–1982), actor
Jerry Paris (1925–1986), actor and Emmy-winning director (The Dick Van Dyke Show)
Charlotte Rae (1926–2018), actress (The Facts of Life)
Tony Randall (born Arthur Leonard Rosenberg, 1920–2004), comic actor
Carl Reiner (1922–2020), actor, film director, producer, writer, and comedian
Regina Resnik (1922-2013), opera singer and actress
Don Rickles (1926–2017), stand-up comedian, actor; pioneer of insult comedy
Fred Sadoff (1926–1994), actor in South Pacific
Mort Sahl (1927–2021), stand-up comedian and actor
Rod Serling (1924–1975), screenwriter and actor (The Twilight Zone)
Simone Signoret (1921–1985), Academy Award-winning French actress
Jerry Stiller (1927–2020), comedian and actor
Mel Tormé (1925–1999), actor, musician, known as "The Velvet Fog", jazz singer and songwriter
Marilyn Tyler (1926–2017), opera singer
Abe Vigoda (1921–2016), film/TV actor (The Godfather)
Shelley Winters (born Shirley Schrift, 1920–2006), two-time Academy Award-winning actress

1910s
Mason Adams (1919–2005), character actor
Martin Balsam (1919–1996), actor; won an Academy Award for A Thousand Clowns
John Banner (1910–1973), Austrian/American actor (Hogan's Heroes)
Red Buttons (born Aaron Chwatt, 1919–2006), Academy Award-winning comedian and actor
Jeff Chandler (born Ira Grossel, 1918-1961), film actor, singer and song writer ––
Lee J. Cobb (born Leo Jacob, 1911–1976), Academy Award-nominated film actor
Kirk Douglas (born Issur Danielovitch, 1916–2020), actor (Spartacus)
John Garfield (born Jacob Garfinkle, 1913–1952), actor
Paulette Goddard (born Marion Levy, 1910–1990), Oscar-nominated film and theatre actress
Kitty Carlisle Hart (born Catherine Conn, 1910–2007), singer, actress, and spokeswoman for the arts
Danny Kaye (born David Daniel Kaminsky, 1911–1987), film actor, singer and comedian
Hedy Lamarr (born Hedwig Kiesler, 1914–2000), actress, invented early form of spread spectrum communications technology, a key to modern wireless communication
Marc Lawrence (born Max Goldsmith, 1910–2005), character actor
Zero Mostel (born Samuel Mostel, 1915–1977), stage and film actor
Jan Murray (born Murray Janofsky, 1916–2006), stand-up comedian, actor
Luise Rainer (1910–2014), German-born American two-time Academy Award-winning film actress
Lillian Roth (born Lillian Rutstein, 1910–1980), singer and actress, performer on Broadway
Dinah Shore (born Frances Rose Shore, 1916–1994), singer and actress
Sylvia Sidney (born Sophia Kosow, 1910–1999), film actress
Phil Silvers (1911–1985), entertainer and comedy actor
Harold J. Stone (born Harold Hochstein, 1913–2005), film/TV character actor
Arnold Stang (1918–2009) American comic actor typically cast as a bespectacled but arrogant and loud-mouthed con artist
Mike Wallace (born Myron Wallace, 1918–2012), journalist, briefly acted during the 1940s
Eli Wallach (1915–2014), film, TV and stage actor
Sam Wanamaker (1919–1993), actor and director
Keenan Wynn (1916–1986), character actor

1900s
Stella Adler (1901–1992), actress and acting teacher
Jack Albertson (1907–1981), actor (Chico and the Man)
Leon Askin (born Leon Aschkenasy, 1907–2005), Austrian American actor
Milton Berle (born Milton Berlinger, 1908–2002), comedian and actor; pioneered vaudeville and stand-up comedy art forms
Joe Besser (1907–1988), comedian (Three Stooges)
Mel Blanc (1908–1989), voice actor and comedian, "The Man of a Thousand Voices", created voices of Bugs Bunny, Daffy Duck, Porky Pig, Tweety Bird, Wile E. Coyote, Barney Rubble
Ben Blue (born Benjamin Bernstein, 1901–1975), Canadian American actor and comedian
Howard Da Silva (born Howard Silverblatt, 1909–1986), film actor
Melvyn Douglas (born Melvyn Hesselberg, 1901–1981), actor, won all three of the entertainment industry's highest awards (two Oscars, a Tony, and an Emmy)
Larry Fine (born Louis Feinberg, 1902–1975), comedian and actor (Three Stooges)
Joseph Green (1900–1996), Polish-American film actor and director
John Houseman (born Jacques Haussmann, 1902–1988), actor; won an Academy Award for The Paper Chase
Curly Howard (born Jerome Horwitz, 1903–1952), one of the Three Stooges
Sam Levene (1905–1980), Russian/American stage and film actor
Peter Lorre (born László Löwenstein, 1904–1964), Austria-Hungary-born American stage and screen actor (M)
Zeppo Marx (1901–1979), member of the Marx Brothers
Sandy Meisner (1905–1997), actor and acting coach; developed acting methodology known as the "Meisner Technique"
Ritz Brothers (Al, Jimmy, and Harry Ritz, 1901–1965, 1904–1985, 1907–1986 respectively), Jewish comedy team
Natalie Schafer (1900–1991), actress (Gilligan's Island)
Lee Strasberg (born Israel Strassberg, 1901–1982), actor, director, and acting teacher in theater and film, who according to author Mel Gussow "revolutionized the art of acting"

1890s
Jack Benny (born Benjamin Kubelsky, 1894–1974), comedian, vaudeville performer, and radio, TV, and film actor
Gertrude Berg (born Tilly Edelstein, 1899–1966), radio/TV actress
Fanny Brice (born Fania Borach, 1891–1951), comedian, singer, and entertainer
George Burns (born Nathan Birnbaum, 1896–1996), comedian and actor
Eddie Cantor (born Israel Iskowitz, 1892–1964), comedian, singer, actor, songwriter
Ricardo Cortez (born Jacob Krantz, 1899–1977), Austrian-born American silent film star, known as a "Latin lover" type
Anthony Frome, (born Abraham Feinberg, 1899–1986), singer, the "Poet Prince of the Air Waves".
Hermione Gingold (1897–1987), British-born actress
Moe Howard (born Moses Horwitz, 1897–1975), "leader" of the Three Stooges
Shemp Howard (born Samuel Horwitz, 1895–1955), member of the Three Stooges
Sam Jaffe (born Shalom Jaffe, 1891–1984), Academy Award-nominated film and stage actor
Irving Kaufman (born Isidore Kaufman, 1890–1976), singer, recording artist, and vaudeville performer
Francis Lederer (1899–2000), Czech-born American actor
Philip Loeb (1892–1955), stage, film, and TV actor
Paul Lukas (1895–1971), Hungarian American film actor
Groucho Marx (born Julius Marx, 1890–1977), comedian, working both with his siblings, the Marx Brothers, and on his own
Gummo Marx (born Milton Marx, 1893–1977), one of the Marx Brothers
Paul Muni (born Meshilem Meier Weisenfreund, 1895–1967), Austrian-born American Academy Award and Tony Award-winning actor
Carmel Myers (1899–1980), silent film actress
Molly Picon (born Małka Opiekun, 1898–1992), actor of stage, screen, and TV
Edward G. Robinson (born Emanuel Goldenberg, 1893–1973), stage and film actor
Mae West (born Mary Jane West, 1893–1980), actress, playwright, screenwriter, and sex symbol

1880s
Broncho Billy Anderson (born Maxwell Aronson, 1880–1971), actor, writer, director, and producer; first star of the Western film genre
Theda Bara (born Theodosia Goodman, 1885–1955), silent film actress; the first screen "vamp"
Douglas Fairbanks (born Douglas Ullman, 1883–1939), actor, screenwriter, director, and producer known for his silent films
Al Jolson (born Asa Yoelson, 1886–1950), singer and actor
Chico Marx (born Leonard Marx, 1887–1961), one of the Marx Brothers
Harpo Marx (born Adolph Marx, 1888–1964), one of the Marx Brothers
Sophie Tucker (born Sonya Kalish, 1884–1966), actress, singer, and comedian
Erich von Stroheim (1885–1957), Austrian-born American filmmaker and actor
Louis Wolheim (1880–1931), character actor in silent films during the 1920s; also appeared on stage and in early sound films (All Quiet on the Western Front)
Ed Wynn (born Isaiah Edwin Leopold, 1886–1966), comedian and actor

Pre–1880s
Alla Nazimova (born Miriam Leventon, 1879–1945), theater and film actress, scriptwriter, and producer
Boris Thomashefsky (1868–1939), Ukrainian-born American singer, actor, Yiddish theater icon
Jacob Pavlovitch Adler (1855–1926), Russian-born American actor, Yiddish theater
Adah Isaacs Menken (1835–1868), actress, dancer, painter, and poet; converted to Judaism upon marrying the first of her four husbands

Comedians

Dan Ahdoot, finalist Last Comic Standing, 2004
Dave Attell (born 1965), stand-up comedian; host of Insomniac with Dave Attell
Victor Borge (born Børge Rosenbaum, 1909–2000), humorist and concert pianist
Andrew Ginsburg (born 1979), comedian, actor, and three-time champion bodybuilder
Tom Lehrer (born 1928), satirist, musician
Ritz Brothers (Al Ritz, Jimmy Ritz, Harry Ritz), see "Actors"
Robert Schimmel (1950–2010), stand-up comedian;
Danny Sexbang (born 1979), member of musical-comedy duo Ninja Sex Party
Jon Stewart (born Jonathan Stuart Leibowitz, 1962), stand-up comedian, actor, author; host, head writer, and producer of The Daily Show
Eric Andre (born 1983), actor, host on the Eric Andre Show, absurdist comedian
Marc Maron (born 1963), stand-up comedian, podcaster, writer, and actor

Film/television directors and producers

J. J. Abrams (born 1966), screenwriter, director, film/TV producer
Woody Allen (born 1935), Oscar-winning screenwriter, director and actor
Eleanor Antin (born 1935), photographer, author, and artist working with video, film, performance, and drawing
Judd Apatow (born 1968), screenwriter, director, film/TV producer
Alan Arkin (born 1934), Academy Award-nominated film actor, director
Danny Arnold (1925–1995), actor/director
Darren Aronofsky (born 1969), film director, screenwriter and producer
Ralph Bakshi (born 1938), film director and animator
Noah Baumbach (born 1969), film screenwriter and director
Henry Bean (born 1945)
Richard Benjamin (born 1938), actor/film director
Curtis Bernhardt (1899–1981, Germany)
Mike Binder (born 1958), director, writer and actor in film and TV
Peter Bogdanovich (born 1939), film actor, writer and director
Zach Braff (born 1975), film/TV actor, director, screenwriter, and producer
John Brahm (1893–1982, Germany)
Albert Brooks (born 1947), film actor, writer and director
James L. Brooks (born 1940), TV and film writer, producer and director
Mel Brooks (born 1926), writer, director and actor of film, TV and stage
Richard Brooks (1912–1992), film director and producer
William Castle (1914–1977), film director and producer
Joel Coen (born 1954) and Ethan Coen (born 1957), Academy Award-winning film writers, directors, producers and editors
George Cukor (1899–1983), Academy Award-winning film director and producer
Michael Curtiz (1886–1962), Academy Award-winning film director
Jules Dassin (1911–2008), once blacklisted writer and director of film
Maya Deren (1917–1961), Film writer, director and actress
Cecil B. DeMille (1881–1959), Academy Award-winning film director and producer
Stanley Donen (1924–2019), film producer and director
Richard Donner (1930–2021), film director, producer and sometimes actor
Robert Downey Sr. (1935–2021), film writer and director
Samuel Fuller (1912–1997), film writer, director and actor
Keith Gordon (born 1961), film actor, director and writer
Lee Grant (born Lyova Haskell Rosenthal, 1927), theater, film, and TV actress, and film director
James Gray (born 1969), film writer and director
Joseph Green (1900–1996), Polish-American film director and actor
Bud Greenspan (1926–2010), director of documentaries on sports
Christopher Guest (born 1948), see "Actors" above
Todd Haynes (born 1961), film writer and director
Amy Heckerling (born 1954), film director
Marshall Herskovitz (born 1952), film producer and director
Arthur Hiller (1923–2016), film director and producer
Agnieszka Holland (born 1948 in Poland)
Nicole Holofcener (born 1960), writer and director in film
Henry Jaglom (born 1938), writer, director and actor in Independent film
Andrew Jarecki (born 1960), film director and producer, musician, and entrepreneur; brother of Eugene Jarecki and half-brother of Nicholas Jarecki
Eugene Jarecki (born 1964), film director, writer, and producer, and author; brother of Andrew Jarecki and half-brother of Nicholas Jarecki
Miranda July (born Miranda Jennifer Grossinger, 1974), Jewish father
Jeremy Paul Kagan (born 1945), film writer and director
Jake Kasdan (born 1975), film writer and director
Lawrence Kasdan (born 1949), film writer and director
Jeffrey Katzenberg (born 1950), film producer, director and co-founder of DreamWorks SKG
Philip Kaufman (born 1936), film director and screenwriter
Henry Koster (1905–1988), film director
Stanley Kramer (1913–2001), director
Stanley Kubrick (1928–1999)
John Landis (born 1950), movie actor, director, writer, and producer
Fritz Lang (1890–1976, Austria, mother born Jewish)
Andy Lassner (born 1966), Colombian-American television producer
Norman Lear (born 1922), film and television director
Mervyn LeRoy (1900–1987), film director
Barry Levinson (born 1942), producer, writer and director of film and TV
Shawn Levy (born 1968), film producer and director
Albert Lewin (1894–1968), film writer, producer and director
Jerry Lewis (1926–2017), film actor, writer and director
Doug Liman (born 1965), film and TV producer and director
 Jonathan Littman (born 1962/1963) television producer
Lynne Littman (born 1941), film and television director and producer
Ernst Lubitsch (1892–1947), film director originally from Germany
Michael Lucas (born 1972, USSR)
Sidney Lumet (1924–2011), film writer, producer and director
David Mamet (born 1947), writer and director of stage and screen
Michael Mann (born 1943), film director, screenwriter, producer
Elaine May (born 1932), film, TV and stage writer, director and actress
Paul Mazursky (1930–2014), see "Actors" above
Lewis Milestone (1895–1980), film director and producer
John Milius (born 1944)
Meredith Monk (born 1942), composer, performer, theater director, vocalist, filmmaker, and choreographer
Errol Morris (born 1948), documentary filmmaker
Mike Nichols (1931–2014), Emmy, Grammy, Tony and Academy Award-winning film and stage director
Leonard Nimoy (1931–2015), film director, actor, writer, singer, songwriter, poet, and photographer
Ken Olin (born 1954), see "Actors" above
Marcel Ophüls (born 1927), documentary filmmaker, son of Max Ophüls
Max Ophüls (1902–1957, Germany), father of Marcel Ophüls
Frank Oz (born 1944), writer, actor and director of film and TV
Alan J. Pakula (1928–1998), film director and producer
Jerry Paris (1925–1986), Emmy-winning television director (The Dick Van Dyke Show, Happy Days)
Larry Peerce (born 1930), film writer and director
Arthur Penn (1922–2010), film director and producer
Sydney Pollack (born 1934), film producer, director, actor and writer
Abraham Polonsky (1910–1999), film writer and director
Otto Preminger (1905–1986), film producer, director and actor
Bob Rafelson (born 1933), film writer-director
Irving Rapper (1898–1999), British-born film director
Brett Ratner (born 1969)
Ron Rifkin (born 1939), actor, director
Jay Roach (born 1957), film director, producer and screenwriter, converted to Judaism
Eli Roth (born 1972), film actor, director, producer and writer
Julian Schnabel (born 1951)
Steve Sekely (1899–1979), Hungarian-born film director
George Sidney (1916–2002), film director, known for MGM films
Joan Micklin Silver (1935–2020)
Bryan Singer (born 1965)
Curt Siodmak (1902–2000)
Robert Siodmak (1900–1973)
Barry Sonnenfeld, director
Steven Spielberg (born 1946)
Edgar Ulmer (1904–1972, Austria-Hungary)
Josef von Sternberg (1894, Austria–1969)
Erich von Stroheim (1885, Austria–1957)
Robin Washington (born 1956)
Claudia Weill (born 1947), film and theater director, educator, cinematographer
Billy Wilder (1906–2002)
William Wyler (1902, Germany–1981)
Fred Zinnemann (1907, Austria–1997)
David Zucker & Jerry Zucker (born 1950), parody directors, producers

Models

Brooke Burke, TV personality and model
Yael Markovich, Israeli/American model/beauty queen
Antonio Sabato Jr., model and actor
Lindsey Vuolo, model and Playboy Playmate

Bar Refaeli, model

TV and radio presenters
Don Francisco (Mario Kreutzberger), network TV host of Sabado Gigante, filmed in Miami
Monty Hall (1924-2017), network TV host of Let's Make a Deal game show
Mary Hart (born 1950), see "Actors" above
Daryn Kagan (born 1963), host of CNN Live Today
Larry King (1993–2021), network TV interviewer
Matt Lauer, co-host on The Today Show
Bernard Meltzer, network radio psychologist advising call-in listeners on variety of problems
Al Michaels (born 1944)
Amy Wynn Pastor (born 1976), carpenter on Trading Spaces
Maury Povich (born 1939), network TV host analyzing relationship problems
Sally Jessie Raphael (born 1935), network radio psychologist
Joan Rivers (1933–2014), talk show host, stage actress/writer, comedian, and celebrity
Daniel Schorr (1916–2010), journalist who covered the world for more than 60 years, last as a senior news analyst for National Public Radio
Jerry Springer (born 1944), host of The Jerry Springer Show
Mike Wallace (1918–2012), journalist, 60 Minutes correspondent
Barbara Walters (1929–2022), media personality, regular fixture on morning TV shows (Today and The View), evening news magazines (20/20), and on The ABC Evening News, as the first female evening news anchor
Dr. Ruth Westheimer (born 1928), better known as Dr. Ruth, German-American sex therapist, talk show host, author, professor, Holocaust survivor, and former Haganah sniper.

Producers and directors (theater)
Persons listed with a double asterisk (**) are producers who have won the Tony Award for Best Musical and/or the Tony Award for Best Play. Those listed with a triple asterisk (***) have won the Tony Award for Best Direction of a Musical and/or Play. Those listed with a quadruple asterisk (****) have won the Tony Award for Best Actor or Best Actress in a Musical or Play.

Herb Alpert, producer, and composer, songwriter, lead singer, and horn player with Tijuana Brass
Boris Aronson, set designer, costume designer and lighting designer
George Axelrod, producer and director
Julian Beck and Judith Malina, founders of Living Theatre
David Belasco, producer and director
Michael Bennett, director & producer, choreographer, dancer **
Rudolf Bing (1902–1997), opera impresario, General Manager of the Metropolitan Opera in New York from 1950 to 1972
Robert Brustein, producer, writer, director, critic, educator
Abe Burrows, director ***
Joseph Chaikin & Peter Feldman, founders of Open Theatre
Paddy Chayefsky, director
Heinrich Conried, theatre owner/operator and producer
Norman Corwin, director
Clive Davis, producer
Cy Feuer, producer, director and theatre owner/operator **
Ron Field, director ***
David Geffen, producer **
Leonard Goldberg, producer
Arthur Hammerstein, producer and director (uncle of Oscar Hammerstein II)
Oscar Hammerstein I, producer and theater director/operator (grandfather of Oscar Hammerstein II)
Oscar Hammerstein II, producer and director
Ben Hecht, idiosyncratic screenwriter, director, producer, playwright, and novelist; known as "the Shakespeare of Hollywood"
Sidney Howard, producer and director
George Jessel, see "Actors (Theater)" above
Robert Kalfin, producer, director, writer **
Mickey Katz, see "Actors (Theater)" above
George S. Kaufman, producer, director, and theater owner/operator
Michael Kidd, director and producer
Alan King, see "Actors (Theater)" above
James Lapine, director and librettist
Norman Lear, creator, head screenwriter, and producer of taboo breaking sitcom All in the Family; also created Maude and The Jeffersons
Ernest Lehman, producer
Sam Levene, see "Actors (Theater)" above
Lucille Lortel, Off-Broadway producer, Lucille Lortel Theatre named after her
Sanford Meisner, founder of Neighbourhood Playhouse
David Merrick, producer and director **
Lorne Michaels, comedian, writer, director, producer, the sole creator, writer, director and producer of Saturday Night Live; also produced film and TV projects that spun off from it
Arthur Miller, playwright
Mitch Miller, producer
Isaac Mizrahi (born 1961), fashion designer
Mike Nichols (1931–2014), Emmy, Grammy, Tony and Academy Award-winning film and stage director
Toby Orenstein, producer and founder of Toby's Dinner Theatre, Columbia Center for Theatrical Arts, and the Young Columbians
Joseph Papp a.k.a. Joe Papp, founded the non-profit NYC Public Theater **
Marc Platt, producer
Harold Prince, director **, ***
Elmer Rice, director and producer
Jerome Robbins, producer and director ***
Billy Rose, director, producer, and theater operator
Morrie Ryskind, director
Rebecca Schull, actress
Shubert family, producers and theater owners **
Anna Sokolow, director
Steven Spielberg, film director, producer
Lee Strasberg and Harold Clurman, co-founders of the Group Theatre
Julie Taymor, director ***
Bob Weinstein, producer, screenwriter
Harvey Weinstein, producer
Efrem Zimbalist Jr., see "Actors (Theater)" above
David Zippel, director

Circus
Paul Binder, co-founder, ringmaster and artistic director of the Big Apple Circus
Abe Goldstein, regarded as "the Greatest Irish Cop Clown" in the business and worked for Ringling Bros. and other circuses

References

External links
Jews in the American Media
Jewish Celebrities

Entertainers
Jewish